Heman Swift (October 14, 1733 – November 12, 1814) was a hero of the American Revolutionary War, known as General Washington's Colonel. He was a Colonel in the Connecticut State Regiment from July to December 1776, the 7th Connecticut Regiment from January 1777 to January 1781 and the 2nd Connecticut Regiment from January 1781 to June 1783.  He was brevetted Brigadier-General on September 30, 1783 and was discharged in December 1783.  He was an Original Member of the Connecticut Society of the Cincinnati.

He was an associate justice of the Connecticut Supreme Court of Errors (now known as the Connecticut Supreme Court) from 1790 to 1802.

References

External links

1733 births
1814 deaths
Justices of the Connecticut Supreme Court
Continental Army officers from Connecticut